The following is a list of events affecting Canadian television in 2018. Events listed include television show debuts, finales, cancellations, and channel launches, closures and rebrandings.

Events

Notable events

January

March

April

August

November

December

Television programs

Programs debuting in 2018
Series currently listed here have been announced by their respective networks as scheduled to premiere in 2018. Note that shows may be delayed or cancelled by the network between now and their scheduled air dates.

Programs ending in 2018

Television films

Deaths

Television stations

Network affiliation changes

Network conversions and rebrandings

Network closures

See also
 2018 in Canada
 List of Canadian films of 2018

References